Emji Saint Spero is a trans queer writer and performance artist living in Los Angeles, California. Their practice occupies a hybrid space between poetry and prose. 

They are a member of curbAlert, a performance duo with J Shelley Harrison, since 2018. 

They co-founded the Oakland-based Timeless, Infinite Light with Joel Gregory. In 2014, Timeless, Infinite Light was a founding collective of Omni Commons, a collectively-run community space in Oakland, along with the Bay Area Public School, and Sudo Room Sudo Room.

Saint Spero is the author of disgust (Nomadic Press, 2021)  and almost any shit will do (Timeless, Infinite Light, 2014), and they co-founded the Oakland-based small press and queer poetry cult Timeless, Infinite Light  with Joel Gregory. With Lauren Levin, they were editor of We Both Laughed in Pleasure: The Selected Diaries of Lou Sullivan (2019), which was awarded the 2020 Lambda Literary Award for Transgender Nonfiction.

Career 
Spero authored two books of poetry, disgust, published by Nomadic Press in 2021, and almost any shit will do, published by Timeless, Infinite Light in March 2014. They co-founded Timeless, Infinite Light, a queer performance art and poetry collective and Omni Commons, a collectively-run community space in Oakland.

Books 

disgust  (Nomadic Press, 2021) 
We Both Laughed in Pleasure: The Selected Diaries of Lou Sullivan Lou Sullivan (Timeless, Infinite Light and Nightboat Books, 2019) 
As Developmental Editor at Timeless, Infinite Light, Saint Spero worked with eds. Ellis Martin and Zach Ozma, as well as The GLBT Historical Society Archives, to publish the diaries of Lou Sullivan, arguably the first gay trans man to medically transition. When Timeless, Infinite Light disbanded in 2019, the collective gave the fully edited and designed book to Nightboat Books for publication. Introduction by Susan Stryker. 
almost any shit will do  (Timeless, Infinite Light, 2014) 
almost any shit will do is a work of conceptual poetry. This book was published as both a paperback trade edition  and a hand-bound, gatefold artist book.

Notes

References

External links 
 

American performance artists
American poets
Queer artists
Living people
Year of birth missing (living people)